Juniperus sabina, the savin juniper or savin, is a species of juniper native to the mountains of central and southern Europe and western and central Asia, from Spain  to eastern Siberia, typically growing at altitudes of .

Description
Juvenile leaves are found mainly on seedlings but mature shrubs sometimes continue to bare some juvenile leaves as well as adult, particularly on shaded shoots low in the crown. It is largely dioecious with separate male and female plants, but some individual plants produce both sexes. The cones are berry-like, 5–9 mm in diameter, blue-black with a whitish waxy bloom, and contain 1-3 (rarely 4 or 5) seeds; they are mature in about 18 months. The male cones are 2–4 mm long, and shed their pollen in early spring.

All parts of the plant are poisonous due to several toxic compounds including ethereal oils.

This plant is the alternate (telial) host of the Pear Rust fungus Gymnosporangium fuscum.

Varieties
There are two varieties, treated by some botanists as distinct species:
Juniperus sabina var. sabina. Juvenile foliage rare in adult plants.
Juniperus sabina var. davurica (Pallas) Farjon (syn. J. davurica Pallas). Juvenile foliage frequent in adult plants.

The hybrid between Juniperus chinensis and Juniperus sabina, known as Juniperus × pfitzeriana (Pfitzer juniper, synonym J. × media), is found in the wild where the two species meet in northwestern China, and is also very common as a cultivated ornamental plant. It is a larger shrub, growing to 30–60 cm tall.

Uses
Juniperus sabina is a popular ornamental shrub in gardens and parks, with numerous named cultivars selected.

Savin was used in abortifacient drugs in 19th-century America.

Gallery

See also
List of Balkan endemic plants

References

sabina
Flora of Europe
Trees of Central Asia
Flora of Western Asia
Plants described in 1753
Taxa named by Carl Linnaeus
Least concern plants
Dioecious plants